Cottonwood River Provincial Park is a provincial park in British Columbia, Canada, located northeast of the confluence of the Fraser and Cottonwood Rivers in that province's North Cariboo region.

There are no active recreational facilities, no maintenance, and camping is prohibited at this park.

See also
Cottonwood Canyon
Cottonwood, British Columbia
Cottonwood House Historic Park
List of British Columbia provincial parks

References

Provincial parks of British Columbia
Geography of the Cariboo
1966 establishments in British Columbia
Protected areas established in 1966